Dinos Dimopoulos (22 August 1921 – 28 February 2003) was a Greek actor, film director, screenwriter and theatre director. He directed more than 40 films between 1953 and 1993.

His 1959 film Astero was entered into the 9th Berlin International Film Festival. His 1960 film Madalena was entered into the 1961 Cannes Film Festival. He wrote also some theatrical plays. He has won the best director award in Thessaloniki Film Festival for the film The Asphalt Fever.

Selected filmography
 Heaven Is Ours (1953)
 The Big Streets (1953)
 Happy Beginning (1954)
 Astero (1959)
 Stournara 288 (1959)
 Madalena (1960)
 Oi kyries tis avlis (1966)
 The Asphalt Fever (1967)
 A Teacher with Blonde Hair (1969)
 Agapisa mia polythrona (1971)

References

External links

1921 births
2003 deaths
People from Aktio-Vonitsa
Greek film directors
Greek screenwriters
Greek documentary filmmakers
Greek theatre directors
Greek dramatists and playwrights
Greek writers
20th-century Greek male actors
20th-century screenwriters